Ciliopagurus alcocki is a species of hermit crab native to New Caledonia.

References

Hermit crabs
Crustaceans described in 1995